Alozie is a Nigerian surname of Igbo origin. Notable people with the surname include:

 Anthony Alozie (born 1986), Australian track and field sprinter
 Glory Alozie (born 1977), Nigerian-Spanish Athlete
 Michael Chimeruche Alozie (born 2001), Nigerian musician
 Mitchelle Alozie (born 1997), American-Nigerian professional footballer
 Michael Chidi Alozie (born 1986), Nigerian professional footballer
 Okezie Alozie (born 1993), American footballer

Surnames of Nigerian origin